Samuel Davies (1870–1913) was an English footballer who played in the Football League for Bury and Luton Town.

References

1870 births
1913 deaths
People from Nantwich
Footballers from Cheshire
English footballers
Association football defenders
English Football League players
Nantwich Town F.C. players
Crewe Alexandra F.C. players
Chester City F.C. players
Gillingham F.C. players
Bury F.C. players
Luton Town F.C. players
Gravesend United F.C. players